Bertland "Bert" Cameron (born 16 November 1959) is a retired Jamaican sprinter who mainly competed over 400 metres. He represented Jamaica at three consecutive editions of the Summer Olympics. Cameron won the 400 m title at the first World Championships in Athletics. He was also the 1982 Commonwealth Games champion in the event and won a number of gold medals at regional competitions. He helped the Jamaican runners to a silver medal in the 4×400 metres relay at the 1988 Seoul Olympics.

He carried the Jamaican flag at the opening ceremony of the 1984 Summer Olympics in Los Angeles, California. He was chosen as the Jamaica Sportsperson of the year three times consecutively from 1981 to 1983. He is currently a coach in Jamaica.

Career

Born in Spanish Town, Saint Catherine Parish, his first medal on the international stage came at the 1978 Commonwealth Games, where he helped Jamaica to a 400 m relay silver medal behind Kenya. His first Olympic appearance soon followed and he reached the quarter-finals of the 400 m and also ran in the relay. He was schooled in the United States on a sports scholarship and won both the NCAA 400 m titles indoors and outdoors in 1980 and 1981, and he went on to obtain a third outdoor title in 1983 for the UTEP Miners. Cameron represented the Americas at the 1981 IAAF World Cup and came away with the bronze medal in both the individual and relay events. He returned to the Commonwealth stage for the 1982 Games and he became the 400 m champion.

Cameron won the 400 m at the inaugural World Championships in 1983. He had a good run in the 1984 Olympic semi-final, but halfway through the race grabbed his leg as a result of picking up a muscle injury. However, in one of the great comebacks of all time he miraculously managed to start running again and qualified for the final. Unfortunately his injury was such that he was not able to take his place in the final. He competed at the 1987 World Championships in Athletics but failed to defend his title, being eliminated in the semi-finals. He helped the Jamaican relay team to sixth place in the final. Four years after his injury-battling run, he ran at the 1988 Summer Olympics and helped win a silver medal in 4 x 400 metres relay.

Outside of his global appearances for Jamaica, he enjoyed success at regional level. He won the 400 m at the 1981 Central American and Caribbean Championships and followed this with another gold medal at the 1982 CAC Games. He returned to the CAC Championships in 1985 and won the silver medal behind Cuba's Roberto Hernández. At the 1987 Pan American Games, he beat the Cuban but again left with the silver medal as Raymond Pierre took the title.

After retiring from running, he became a coach in Kingston, Jamaica. He took on Jermaine Gonzales and his charge broke the 400 m Jamaican record in 2010. He decided to start working with Gonzales within Glen Mills' Racers Track Club that year.

International competitions

References

External links

1959 births
Living people
People from Saint Catherine Parish
Jamaican male sprinters
Olympic athletes of Jamaica
Olympic silver medalists for Jamaica
Athletes (track and field) at the 1980 Summer Olympics
Athletes (track and field) at the 1984 Summer Olympics
Athletes (track and field) at the 1988 Summer Olympics
Commonwealth Games gold medallists for Jamaica
Commonwealth Games silver medallists for Jamaica
Commonwealth Games medallists in athletics
Athletes (track and field) at the 1978 Commonwealth Games
Athletes (track and field) at the 1982 Commonwealth Games
Pan American Games medalists in athletics (track and field)
Athletes (track and field) at the 1979 Pan American Games
Athletes (track and field) at the 1987 Pan American Games
World Athletics Championships athletes for Jamaica
World Athletics Championships medalists
UTEP Miners men's track and field athletes
University of Texas at El Paso alumni
Medalists at the 1988 Summer Olympics
Olympic silver medalists in athletics (track and field)
Pan American Games silver medalists for Jamaica
Competitors at the 1982 Central American and Caribbean Games
Central American and Caribbean Games gold medalists for Jamaica
World Athletics Championships winners
Central American and Caribbean Games medalists in athletics
Medalists at the 1979 Pan American Games
Medalists at the 1987 Pan American Games
Medallists at the 1982 Commonwealth Games